Princess Charlotte was launched in New York in 1810 or 1811 under another name, but captured by the British in 1813. The prize court condemned her on 11 March 1813. Pirie & C. purchased her and renamed her. She then sailed to the West Indies, Central America, and Peru before wrecking on 2 April 1824 off Belize.

Career
Princess Charlotte first appeared in the Register of Shipping (RS) in 1814. It showed her as having been built in New York in 1810. Lloyd's Register (LR) gave the launch year as 1811.

On 8 February 1821 Princess Charlotte, Lamb, master, left Belize. She ran on to one of the banks but was expected to get off. She arrived off Dover on 1 April.

Fate
A letter from Honduras dated 2 April 1824 reported that Princess Charlotte, Lyon, master, had been wrecked on the Main Reef, near Tobacco Key (Tobacco Caye, Belize), as she was coming from London. She had bilged and was full of water, but it was hoped that if the weather remained moderate some of her cargo might be saved.

Citations and references
Citations

References
 

1810 ships
Ships built in the United States
Captured ships
Age of Sail merchant ships of England
Maritime incidents in February 1821
Maritime incidents in April 1824